The Croatia men's national field hockey team represents Croatia in international field hockey competitions and is controlled by the Croatian Hockey Federation, the governing body for field hockey in Croatia.

Croatia has never qualified for the Summer Olympics, World Cup or the European Championship. They mainly compete in the  EuroHockey Championship II and the  EuroHockey Championship III, the second and third level of the EuroHockey Championships.

Tournament history

European championships

Hockey World League

*Draws include knockout matches decided on a penalty shoot-out.

Hockey Series

See also
Croatia women's national field hockey team
Yugoslavia men's national field hockey team

References

European men's national field hockey teams
field hockey
National team
Men's sport in Croatia